In Mandaeism, Simat Hayyi or Simat Hiia, the personification of life, is an uthra (angel or guardian) from the World of Light who is the wife of Yawar Ziwa.

The name Simat Hayyi ("Life's Treasure"), along with the name Niṭufta ("Drop", sometimes also translated as "Cloud"), are names used for the consort of Yawar Ziwa or the Great Mana in the World of Light.

Jorunn Jacobsen Buckley interprets a passage in the Qolasta referring to Simat Hayyi coming forth from the World of Darkness and eventually being raised to the Place of Light as referring to Ruha, noting that E. S. Drower had interpreted it in reference to Zahreil, but arguing that Zahreil never left the World of Darkness. Buckley therefore argues that the Mandaean texts consider Ruha will eventually attain redemption, and merge with her dmuta (ideal counterpart) in the World of Light.

See also
List of angels in theology
Zlat

Barbelo
Mana (Mandaeism)
Treasure of Life, one of the works of Mani (title in Syriac: Simath Hayye)
Matthew 6:19–20

References

Uthras
Mandaean given names
Individual angels
Treasures in religion
Personifications in Mandaeism